Pete Goss, MBE (born 22 December 1961) is a British yachtsman who has sailed more than .

A former Royal Marine, he is famous for his pioneering project Team Philips. He was invested in the Legion d'Honneur for saving fellow sailor Raphaël Dinelli in the 1996 Vendée Globe solo around the world yacht race.  During a severe storm in the Southern Ocean, he turned his boat around and spent two days sailing into hurricane-force winds, finally finding Dinelli in a life-raft that had been dropped by an Australian Air Force plane shortly before the yacht had sunk. Dinelli is said to have come aboard clutching a bottle of champagne.

He trained the original set of amateur crews for the British Steel Challenge, and competed in the race on board Hoffbräu Lager, coming 3rd overall.

Goss lives in Torpoint, Cornwall, and has three children: Alex, Livvy and Eliot.

In June 2008, Goss launched a replica of a 19th-century wooden lugger called Spirit of Mystery. Four months later, he began a voyage from Cornwall to Australia on the boat, which has no modern electrical or navigation systems.

Creative works
 Close to the Wind (1999)

References

External links
 

1960s births
Living people
English male sailors (sport)
ISAF World Sailor of the Year (male)
Recipients of the Legion of Honour
Royal Marines ranks
Members of the Order of the British Empire
People educated at Plymouth College
People from Torpoint
IMOCA 50 class sailors
Vendée Globe finishers
1996 Vendee Globe sailors
British Vendee Globe sailors